Agawa may refer to:

 Agawa (plant in Polish language)
 Agawa (surname)
 Agawa District, Kōchi, Japan
 Agawa, Kōchi, a village in Agawa District
 Agawa River, a river in Ontario, Canada
 Agawa Canyon, a canyon in Ontario, Canada

See also
 Agaw people, in the Horn of Africa
 Agaw languages, spoken by the Agaw
 Agawam (disambiguation)